Peter Williams (born 12 March 1954) is a Welsh football goalkeeping coach and former player.

He most notably played for Preston North End under Bobby Charlton but spent a decade at Telford United. He has since been a professional goalkeeping coach for over 30 years, and has notably worked on the Premier League coaching staff at Sunderland as well as Northampton Town, Wolverhampton Wanderers, Bradford City, Shrewsbury Town, Swindon Town, Preston North End, Derby County, Nottingham Forest and Grimsby Town.

Playing career
Williams started out as a 14 year old and turned out at youth level for Llandudno Junction, Llandudno Junction and Conwy United. He played in the Rhyl team that won the Welsh Amateur Cup in 1973.

Williamns then signed for Preston North End under the management of Bobby Charlton, playing alongside the likes of Nobby Stiles, Francis Burns, Mark Lawrenson, David Sadler and Tony Morley. With first team opportunities limited he joined Telford United, and although mainly an understudy to Kevin Charlton, he was part of several good cup runs including the 1985 FA Cup team that played against Everton.

Coaching career 
Initially becoming a goalkeeping coach at Non-League Shifnall Town and later moved on to similar roles at Northampton Town, Wolverhampton Wanderers and Shrewsbury Town. He also spent a brief spell as a guest trainer for S.S. Lazio before working under Chris Kamara at Bradford City.

Williams joined the coaching staff at Premier League side Sunderland under Peter Reid and spent six seasons with before joining Billy Davies at Derby County Preston North End and Nottingham Forest

Williams has worked closely with a number of recognised goalkeepers such as Andy Lonergan, Thomas Sorenson, Bernard Lama, Lee Camp, Karl Darlow. and Mark Schwarzer.

On 21 December 2020, Williams joined the coaching staff at Grimsby Town under Ian Holloway but resigned two days later alongside him following a 2–1 home defeat to Bradford City.

References

External links
 

1954 births
People from Colwyn Bay
Sportspeople from Conwy County Borough
Welsh footballers
Association football goalkeepers
Association football goalkeeping coaches
Rhyl F.C. players
Conwy Borough F.C. players
Preston North End F.C. players
Telford United F.C. players
Shifnal Town F.C. players
Northampton Town F.C. non-playing staff
Wolverhampton Wanderers F.C. non-playing staff
Bradford City A.F.C. non-playing staff
Shrewsbury Town F.C. non-playing staff
Swindon Town F.C. non-playing staff
Preston North End F.C. non-playing staff
Sunderland A.F.C. non-playing staff
Derby County F.C. non-playing staff
Nottingham Forest F.C. non-playing staff
Grimsby Town F.C. non-playing staff
Living people